Kang Geun Shin is a South Korean-born computer scientist and the Kevin and Nancy O'Connor Professor of Computer Science in the Electrical Engineering and Computer Science Department at the University of Michigan. He is also the founding director of the Real-Time Computing Laboratory (RTCL). He is known for his contributions to the field of real-time fault-tolerant systems. Shin is a recipient of the Korean Ho-Am Prize in Engineering. This prize is awarded for the "outstanding contributions to the development of science and culture and enhancement of the welfare of mankind".

Education
Shin received a BS (1970) in electronic engineering from Seoul National University and an MS (1976) and a PhD (1978) in electrical engineering from Cornell University.

Research interests
Wireless real-time networking
Computation and network security
Cyber-physical systems
Virtualization-based server consolidation and resource management

Real-Time Computing Laboratory (RTCL)
RTCL is a research group in the EECS dept. at University of Michigan. The research topics at RTCL include:

Quality-of-Service (QoS) sensitive computation and networking, especially focusing on Internet services and applications
Real-time operating systems and middleware services
Distributed system architectures for timeliness and dependability QoS
Fault-tolerant system design, analysis, and validation
Open controller software architectures and real time databases for embedded systems like automobiles, automated homes and factories.
RTCL Alumni Tree

References

External links

University of Michigan faculty
Living people
1946 births
Cornell University alumni
Seoul National University alumni
South Korean computer scientists
Recipients of the Ho-Am Prize in Engineering